Cameron Michael Parkes (born May 19, 1958) is an American composer known primarily for his work in Film and Television. He is a graduate of the film scoring program at UCLA and a member of ASCAP.

Parkes' concert works, "Gettysburg Address", "Mississippi River Reflections" and "Gershwinesque" (as well as two vocal selections from his score to the musical, Happy Birthday, Mr. President), received their national premieres in concerts broadcast as part of the "Sundays At Four" radio series. Parkes contributed both music and lyrics to the musicals Happy Birthday, Mr. President (about Marilyn Monroe) and Tanzi. The latter received the Drama-Logue Award for best musical of the 1984 Season. As a record producer, Parkes is best known for the 2004 release of the critically acclaimed "A Tribute To Brian Wilson" (Varèse Sarabande / Universal Music). In addition, Parkes is the founder of Cinecam Music Productions.

Parkes also collaborated with the late Jan Berry, as a vocal arranger and singer, on the Jan & Dean album Port to Paradise, released in 1986.

Albums
 A Tribute to Brian Wilson – Varèse Sarabande (arranger, producer, and performer, 2004)
 Encomium In Memoriam Vol. 1 – Jan Berry Of Jan & Dean (arranger, producer, performer) 2008
 Maelstrom Beach with Box O' Clox – Cinecam (arranger, producer, performer) 2008
 The Quickening with Box O' Clox – Cinecam (arranger, producer, and performer, 2004)
 The String Quartet Tribute to Shania Twain – Vitamin Records (arranger and producer, 2004)
 The Little Witch of Wichita – (cast album, producer, 2002)

Film
 Village Voices (2013)
 Ivy Roots (Short, 2008)
 Midnite Matinee (2007)
 Japanese Soup Torture (2007)
 Soiled Love (2007)
 Nerve Endings (Short, 2006)
 The Tulpa (Short, 2005)
 My Bad Dad (2004)- (co-contributor)
 Blind Sight (Feature, 2001)
 Hijinx (Feature, 2001)
 No Dialogue (Short)
 The Far Corner (Feature)

Television
 "Famous" Various Cues (Biography Channel)
 "Jan & Dean: The Other Beach Boys" (A&E Television Networks, Biography, 2002)
 The Killer Within (PBS)
 Teachers Only (ABC pilot, American Broadcasting Company)
 The Global Challenge (cable)
 Diseases in Children (CNBC)
 Barbara's POV (cable)

Theater
 Happy Birthday Mr. President (music, lyrics, and book / additional lyrics and book by Paul Levine) Leo S. Bing Theater (1997), Barnsdall Theater (1998), New American Renegade Theater (1999).
 Tanzi (contributed music) – Drama-Logue's Best Musical Award – 1984 Season—Cast Theater (1983), Roxy Theater (1984)
 A Far better Place (music, lyrics, and book)
 Bah! Humbug! (music, lyrics, and book)

Concert music
 "Mississippi River Reflections" for Orchestra, Premiere: November 27, 1992, SUNDAYS AT FOUR broadcast.
 "Gettysburg Address" for Speaker & Orchestra, Premiere: November 27, 1992, SUNDAYS AT FOUR broadcast.
 "Gershwinesque" Premiere: June 23, 1991, SUNDAYS AT FOUR broadcast.
 Happy Birthday, Mr. President (Two Vocal Selections from The Musical)
Premiere: December 12, 1996, SUNDAYS AT FOUR broadcast.

Miscellaneous
 Brian Wilson (reissue) Warner Bros. Records / Rhino Archives – credit in liner notes
 Ennio Morricone Film Music Anthology (BMG/VIRGIN) / Consultant – credit in liner notes
 KABC Talk Radio (theme music)

References

 A Tribute To Brian Wilson (Varèse Sarabande / Universal Music): MTV News, Alyssa Rasbaum, November 22, 2004 / Ventura County Star, Mark Wykoff, September 30, 2004
 Happy Birthday, Mr. President (A Marilyn Monroe related musical): People.com, Stephen M. Silverman, August 31, 2000 / Variety (magazine), Army Archerd, August 31, 2000)

External links
 Box o' Clox
 Cameron Michael Parkes at IMDb (Internet Movie Database)
 Jan Berry / Jan & Dean Tribute Album
 ("Encomium In Memoriam" review)

1958 births
Living people
American male composers
21st-century American composers
American record producers
21st-century American male musicians